Indogofera astragalina, a legume also known as silky indigo, is a herb found in India, tropical Africa, Madagascar, New Guinea and Australia. It commonly grows in sandy or rocky soils in dry deciduous forests or along roadsides and lake margins. It is also cultivated.

References

astragalina
Flora of Africa
Flora of Asia